Top of the Pops Reloaded (TOTP Reloaded), is a weekly children's music show broadcast as part of the Saturday morning CBBC schedule on BBC Two. It was based on the show, Top of the Pops, and was originally known as Top of the Pops Saturday from 2002 to 2005.

It was shown on BBC Two at 11am on Saturdays and repeated at 6pm on the CBBC Channel on Sunday. Presenters included Fearne Cotton, Sam Nixon and Mark Rhodes. The show also regularly featured Radio 1 DJs JK & Joel. From episode twelve onwards, a new feature was introduced where digital viewers could press their red button to access a different choice of music. Richard Oliff was the first ever 'Dad-Dancer' to be featured on the show, performing to Mylo's Doctor Pressure.

Top of the Pops Saturday

Top of the Pops Saturday began on 21 September 2002 as part of the relaunched format of The Saturday Show, as a 45-minute show-within-a-show, taking up the final section of the programme; TOTP Saturday was presented by The Saturday Shows presenters of the time, Fearne Cotton and Simon Grant

The introduction of TOTP Saturday was seen as an attempt by the BBC to combat the successful ITV Saturday morning series SMTV Live, the last hour of which was given over to music magazine CD:UK. Whereas the BBC had traditionally been dominant in the Saturday morning slot, SMTV Live and CD:UK were hugely successful, something which had contributed to the poor reception of the original version of The Saturday Show, and its subsequent relaunch.

Top of the Pops Reloaded
Following the BBC's decision to end The Saturday Show as a year-round run (and instead run it between series of Dick & Dom in da Bungalow), TOTP Saturday split off and continued as a billed show in its own right, hosted primarily by Fearne Cotton. This continued until the summer of 2005, when the programme took a break from the screen, returning in the Reloaded format in September 2005. This ran alongside the final series of Dick and Dom in da Bungalow, and both Dick & Dom... and TOTP Reloaded ended in March 2006.

Shortly after the demise of TOTP Reloaded, the main weekly Top of the Pops also came to an end. As a result of the demise of the parent show, the Saturday morning spin-off was also decommissioned, though another spin-off series, TOTP2, featuring archive Top of the Pops footage, continued.

References

External links 
 
 

BBC Television shows
Pop music television series
Top of the Pops
2000s British music television series
2005 British television series debuts
2006 British television series endings
English-language television shows
British television spin-offs
British children's musical television series
2000s British children's television series